Big Creek is a census-designated place (CDP) in Logan County, West Virginia, United States. Big Creek has a post office with ZIP code 25505. As of the 2010 census, its population was 237.

The community takes its name from nearby Big Creek.

References

Census-designated places in Logan County, West Virginia
Census-designated places in West Virginia
Coal towns in West Virginia
Populated places on the Guyandotte River